Built is an American reality television series on the Style Network that premiered on January 28, 2013. Built follows a Manhattan-based home decor and construction company that is staffed with all male models who also have experience as being handymen.

Cast

 Shane Duffy
 Sandy Dias
 Gage Cass
 Donny Ware
 Mike Keute
 Kim Gieske: Gieske works with the team to make sure everything goes as planned.

Episodes

References

2010s American reality television series
2013 American television series debuts
2013 American television series endings
English-language television shows
Style Network original programming
Television series by Endemol